The name Cleombrotus may refer to:

Cleombrotus (regent), uncle and regent of Spartan king Pleistarchus
Cleombrotus I (d. 371 BC), king of Sparta from 380 to 371 BC
Cleombrotus II, king of Sparta from 242 to 241 BC
Cleombrotus of Ambracia, a character in Plato's Phaedo